Material released by The Shamen.

Albums

Studio albums

Compilation albums
 Strange Day Dreams (1988) (re-released 1991) (Italian release of early material)
 Progeny (1991) (19 remixes (14 on CD) of "Move Any Mountain (Progen 91)" plus 16 samples and loops) UK Albums Chart No. 23
 On Air (1993) (Live BBC radio sessions) UK No. 61
 Different Drum (1993) (Remixed version of Boss Drum)
 Collection (1996)
 Remix Collection – Stars on 25 (1996)
 The Shamen Collection (1998) consisting of Collection and Remix Collection UK No. 26
 Hystericool – The Best of the Alternative Mixes (2002)

Singles

Music videos

References

External links
 The Shamen discography at Discogs
 Unofficial The Shamen discography

Discographies of British artists
Pop music group discographies
Rock music group discographies
Discography